Sergey Pynzar is a Transnistrian lawmaker of the Grigoriopol District legislature.

He ran against President Vadim Krasnoselsky in the 2021 Transnistrian election and received 12.96% of the vote.

References

Living people
Transnistrian politicians
People from Grigoriopol District
1973 births